Daniel Oberkofler (born July 16, 1988) is an Austrian professional ice hockey player who is currently playing for the Graz99ers of the ICE Hockey League (ICEHL). Oberkofler competed in the 2013 IIHF World Championship as a member of the Austria men's national ice hockey team.

Playing career
On February, 2013, Daniel, playing for Austria's men's national Ice Hockey team, scored two goals against Italy in the Group D of the Men's Final Olympic Qualification.

On May 7, 2013, the Austrian forward also scored a goal against Latvia during a preliminary round game of the 2013 IIHF World Championship in Helsinki, Finland.

At the conclusion of the 2016–17 season, and after 11 seasons playing with EHC Black Wings Linz, Oberkofler returned to his original club, Graz 99ers, on March 15, 2017.

Career statistics

Regular season and playoffs

International

References

External links

1988 births
Living people
Austrian ice hockey centres
EHC Black Wings Linz players
Graz 99ers players
Ice hockey players at the 2014 Winter Olympics
Olympic ice hockey players of Austria
Sportspeople from Graz